The 2020–21 Washington Capitals season was the 47th season for the National Hockey League franchise that was established on June 11, 1974. This was the first season for Peter Laviolette as head coach of the Capitals after their former head coach Todd Reirden was fired from the team on August 23, 2020. On December 20, 2020, the league temporarily realigned into four divisions with no conferences due to the COVID-19 pandemic and the ongoing closure of the Canada–United States border. As a result of this realignment, the Capitals would play this season in the East Division and would play against only the other teams in their new division during the regular season and potentially the first two rounds of the playoffs.

On April 29, the Capitals clinched a playoff berth after a 5–4 overtime loss to the Pittsburgh Penguins. As a result of the Capitals winning in overtime against the Philadelphia Flyers while the Penguins won in regulation against the Buffalo Sabres on May 8, the Penguins won the East division title, and the Capitals failed to win the division for the first time since the 2014–15 season. They were eliminated from the playoffs in the First Round with a 3–1 loss to the Boston Bruins in game five on May 23.

Standings

Divisional standings

Schedule and results

Regular season
The regular season schedule was published on December 23, 2020.

|- style="background:#cfc;"
| 1 || January 14 || @ Buffalo || 6–4 ||  || Samsonov || 0 || 1–0–0 || 2 || 
|- style="background:#cfc;"
| 2 || January 15 || @ Buffalo || 2–1 ||  || Vanecek || 0 || 2–0–0 || 4 || 
|- style="background:#fff;"
| 3 || January 17 || @ Pittsburgh || 3–4 || SO || Samsonov || 0 || 2–0–1 || 5 || 
|- style="background:#fff;"
| 4 || January 19 || @ Pittsburgh || 4–5 || OT || Vanecek || 0 || 2–0–2 || 6 || 
|- style="background:#cfc;"
| 5 || January 22 || Buffalo || 4–3 || SO || Vanecek || 0 || 3–0–2 || 8 || 
|- style="background:#fff;"
| 6 || January 24 || Buffalo || 3–4 || SO || Vanecek || 0 || 3–0–3 || 9 || 
|- style="background:#cfc;"
| 7 || January 26 || NY Islanders || 3–2 ||  || Vanecek || 0 || 4–0–3 || 11 || 
|- style="background:#cfc;"
| 8 || January 28 || NY Islanders || 6–3 ||  || Vanecek || 0 || 5–0–3 || 13 || 
|- style="background:#cfc;"
| 9 || January 30 || Boston || 4–3 || OT || Vanecek || 0 || 6–0–3 || 15 || 
|-

|- style="background:#fcc;"
| 10 || February 1 || Boston || 3–5 ||  || Vanecek || 0 || 6–1–3 || 15 || 
|- style="background:#fcc;"
| 11 || February 4 || @ NY Rangers || 2–4 ||  || Vanecek || 0 || 6–2–3 || 15 || 
|- style="background:#fcc;"
| 12 || February 7 || Philadelphia || 4–7 ||  || Anderson || 0 || 6–3–3 || 15 || 
|- style="background:#ccc;"
| – || February 9 || Philadelphia || – || colspan="6"|Postponed due to COVID-19. Rescheduled for April 13.
|- style="background:#ccc;"
| – || February 11 || @ Buffalo || – || colspan="6"|Postponed due to COVID-19. Rescheduled for March 15.
|- style="background:#ccc;"
| – || February 13 || @ Buffalo || – || colspan="6"|Postponed due to COVID-19. Rescheduled for April 9.
|- style="background:#fcc;"
| 13 || February 14 || @ Pittsburgh || 3–6 ||  || Vanecek || 0 || 6–4–3 || 15 || 
|- style="background:#cfc;"
| 14 || February 16 || @ Pittsburgh || 3–1 ||  || Vanecek || 0 || 7–4–3 || 17 || 
|- style="background:#cfc;"
| 15 || February 18 || Buffalo || 3–1 ||  || Vanecek || 0 || 8–4–3 || 19 || 
|- style="background:#fcc;"
| 16 || February 20 || NY Rangers || 1–4 ||  || Vanecek || 0 || 8–5–3 || 19 || 
|- style="background:#cfc;"
| 17 || February 21 || New Jersey || 4–3 ||  || Anderson || 0 || 9–5–3 || 21 || 
|- style="background:#fff;"
| 18 || February 23 || Pittsburgh || 2–3 || OT || Vanecek || 0 || 9–5–4 || 22 || 
|- style="background:#cfc;"
| 19 || February 25 || Pittsburgh || 5–2 ||  || Vanecek || 0 || 10–5–4 || 24 || 
|- style="background:#cfc;"
| 20 || February 27 || @ New Jersey || 5–2 ||  || Vanecek || 0 || 11–5–4 || 26 || 
|- style="background:#cfc;"
| 21 || February 28 || @ New Jersey || 3–2 ||  || Samsonov || 0 || 12–5–4 || 28 || 
|-

|- style="background:#cfc;"
| 22 || March 3 || @ Boston || 2–1 || SO || Vanecek || 0 || 13–5–4 || 30 || 
|- style="background:#fcc;"
| 23 || March 5 || @ Boston || 1–5 ||  || Vanecek || 0 || 13–6–4 || 30 || 
|- style="background:#cfc;"
| 24 || March 7 || @ Philadelphia || 3–1 ||  || Samsonov || 3,023 || 14–6–4 || 32 || 
|- style="background:#cfc;"
| 25 || March 9 || New Jersey || 5–4 || OT || Vanecek || 0 || 15–6–4 || 34 || 
|- style="background:#cfc;"
| 26 || March 11 || @ Philadelphia || 5–3 ||  || Samsonov || 2,807 || 16–6–4 || 36 || 
|- style="background:#cfc;"
| 27 || March 13 || @ Philadelphia || 5–4 ||  || Samsonov || 3,083 || 17–6–4 || 38 || 
|- style="background:#cfc;"
| 28 || March 15 || @ Buffalo || 6–0 ||  || Vanecek || 0 || 18–6–4 || 40 || 
|- style="background:#cfc;"
| 29 || March 16 || NY Islanders || 3–1 ||  || Samsonov || 0 || 19–6–4 || 42 || 
|- style="background:#cfc;"
| 30 || March 19 || NY Rangers || 2–1 ||  || Vanecek || 0 || 20–6–4 || 44 || 
|- style="background:#fcc;"
| 31 || March 20 || NY Rangers || 1–3 ||  || Samsonov || 0 || 20–7–4 || 44 || 
|- style="background:#cfc;"
| 32 || March 25 || New Jersey || 4–3 ||  || Vanecek || 0 || 21–7–4 || 46 || 
|- style="background:#cfc;"
| 33 || March 26 || New Jersey || 4–0 ||  || Samsonov || 0 || 22–7–4 || 48 || 
|- style="background:#cfc;"
| 34 || March 28 || NY Rangers || 5–4 ||  || Samsonov || 0 || 23–7–4 || 50 || 
|- style="background:#fcc;"
| 35 || March 30 || @ NY Rangers || 2–5 ||  || Vanecek || 1,761 || 23–8–4 || 50 || 
|-

|- style="background:#fcc;"
| 36 || April 1 || @ NY Islanders || 4–8 ||  || Samsonov || 1,400 || 23–9–4 || 50 || 
|- style="background:#cfc;"
| 37 || April 2 || @ New Jersey || 2–1 || OT || Vanecek || 3,600 || 24–9–4 || 52 || 
|- style="background:#cfc;"
| 38 || April 4 || @ New Jersey || 5–4 ||  || Samsonov || 3,600 || 25–9–4 || 54 || 
|- style="background:#fcc;"
| 39 || April 6 || @ NY Islanders || 0–1 ||  || Vanecek || 1,400 || 25–10–4 || 54 || 
|- style="background:#fcc;"
| 40 || April 8 || Boston || 2–4 ||  || Samsonov || 0 || 25–11–4 || 54 || 
|- style="background:#cfc;"
| 41 || April 9 || @ Buffalo || 4–3 ||  || Vanecek || — || 26–11–4 || 56 || 
|- style="background:#cfc;"
| 42 || April 11 || @ Boston || 8–1 ||  || Vanecek || 2,191 || 27–11–4 || 58 || 
|- style="background:#cfc;"
| 43 || April 13 || Philadelphia || 6–1 ||  || Samsonov || 0 || 28–11–4 || 60 || 
|- style="background:#fcc;"
| 44 || April 15 || Buffalo || 2–5 ||  || Vanecek || 0 || 28–12–4 || 60 || 
|- style="background:#cfc;"
| 45 || April 17 || @ Philadelphia || 6–3 ||  || Samsonov || 3,430 || 29–12–4 || 62 || 
|- style="background:#fcc;"
| 46 || April 18 || @ Boston || 3–6 ||  || Vanecek || 2,191 || 29–13–4 || 62 || 
|- style="background:#cfc;"
| 47 || April 22 || @ NY Islanders || 1–0 || SO || Samsonov || 1,400 || 30–13–4 || 64 || 
|- style="background:#cfc;"
| 48 || April 24 || @ NY Islanders || 6–3 ||  || Samsonov || 1,400 || 31–13–4 || 66 || 
|- style="background:#cfc;"
| 49 || April 27 || NY Islanders || 1–0 ||  || Vanecek || 2,133 || 32–13–4 || 68 || 
|- style="background:#fff;"
| 50 || April 29 || Pittsburgh || 4–5 || OT || Vanecek || 2,133 || 32–13–5 || 69 || 
|-

|- style="background:#fcc;"
| 51 || May 1 || Pittsburgh || 0–3 ||  || Samsonov || 2,133 || 32–14–5 || 69 || 
|- style="background:#cfc;"
| 52 || May 3 || @ NY Rangers || 6–3 ||  || Vanecek || 1,800 || 33–14–5 || 71 || 
|- style="background:#cfc;"
| 53 || May 5 || @ NY Rangers || 4–2 ||  || Vanecek || 1,800 || 34–14–5 || 73 || 
|- style="background:#fcc;"
| 54 || May 7 || Philadelphia || 2–4 ||  || Vanecek || 2,133 || 34–15–5 || 73 || 
|- style="background:#cfc;"
| 55 || May 8 || Philadelphia || 2–1 || OT || Anderson || 2,133 || 35–15–5 || 75 || 
|- style="background:#cfc;"
| 56 || May 11 || Boston  || 2–1 ||  || Vanecek || 2,133 || 36–15–5 || 77 || 
|-

|-
|

Playoffs

|- style="background:#cfc;"
| 1 || May 15 || Boston || 3–2 || OT || Anderson || 5,333 || 1–0 || 
|- style="background:#fcc;"
| 2 || May 17 || Boston || 3–4 || OT || Anderson || 5,333 || 1–1 || 
|- style="background:#fcc;"
| 3 || May 19 || @ Boston || 2–3 || 2OT || Samsonov || 4,565 || 1–2 || 
|- style="background:#fcc;"
| 4 || May 21 || @ Boston || 1–4 ||  || Samsonov || 4,565 || 1–3 || 
|- style="background:#fcc;"
| 5 || May 23 || Boston || 1–3 ||  || Samsonov || 5,333 || 1–4 || 
|-

|-
|

Player statistics

Skaters

Goaltenders

†Denotes player spent time with another team before joining the Capitals. Stats reflect time with the Capitals only.
‡Denotes player was traded mid-season. Stats reflect time with the Capitals only.
Bold/italics denotes franchise record.

Draft picks

Below are the Washington Capitals' selections at the 2020 NHL Entry Draft, which was originally scheduled for June 26–27, 2020 at the Bell Center in Montreal, Quebec, but was postponed on March 25, 2020, due to the COVID-19 pandemic. On October 6–7, 2020 the draft was held virtually via Video conference call from the NHL Network studio in Secaucus, New Jersey.

References

Notes

Washington Capitals seasons
Capitals
Washington Capitals
Washington Capitals